Allan Watt Downie FRS (5 September 1901 – 26 January 1988) was a Scottish microbiologist involved in the eradication of smallpox. He was elected a Fellow of the Royal Society in March 1955.

Downie bodies are named for him.

See also
 Hal Downey

References

External links
 Image held at The National Portrait Gallery

1901 births
1988 deaths
British microbiologists
Fellows of the Royal Society
20th-century Scottish medical doctors